Angels Running is an album by the American singer-songwriter Patty Larkin, released in 1993. Larkin supported the album with a North American tour.

Production
The album was produced by Ben Wisch and John Leventhal. Larkin played guitar, mandolin, and accordion. "Channeling Marlene" is about Marlene Dietrich. "Video" ridicules the music business.

Critical reception

The New York Times deemed it Larkin's best album, and praised the "smoky, slightly weatherbeaten folk-pop voice that resonates with a plucky resignation and humor." The Orlando Sentinel determined that "the album's substance generally manages to keep up with its style, which is considerable."

AllMusic wrote that "Larkin continues the good fight, penning some fantastic tunes and delivering them with a fine blend of class and humor."

Track listing

 "Who Holds Your Hand"
 "Do Not Disturb"
 "Good Thing (Angels Running)"
 "Banish Misfortune/Open Hand"
 "Might as Well Dance"
 "Ain't That as Good"
 "Helen"
 "I Told Him that My Dog Wouldn't Run"
 "Pundits and Poets"
 "Booth of Glass"
 "Winter Wind"
 "Channeling Marlene"
 "Video"

All songs were written by Patty Larkin except Banish Misfortune/Open Hand (traditional).

Personnel
 Patty Larkin – vocals, guitars, mandolin, accordion
 John Leventhal – guitars, bazouki, mandolin, keyboards, percussion, backing vocals
 Michael Manring – fretless bass, bass, e bow
 Richard Gates – bass guitar
 Ben Wisch – keyboards
 Dennis McDermott – drums, percussion
 Glen Velez – percussion
 Bashiri Johnson – percussion
 Jonatha Brooke – backing vocals 
 Mary Chapin Carpenter – backing vocals 
 Judith Casselberry – backing vocals 
 Casselberry-Du Pree – backing vocals 
 Catharine David – backing vocals 
 Champion Jack Dupree – backing vocals 
 Jacqué Dupreé – backing vocals 
 Milt Grayson – backing vocals 
 Jennifer Kimball – backing vocals 
 Curtis King – backing vocals 
 Madeline – backing vocals 
 Kenny Williams – backing vocals

References

Patty Larkin albums
1993 albums